is a 2009 Japanese drama film directed by Miwa Nishikawa, starring Tsurube Shofukutei. It won the award for Best Film at the 31st Yokohama Film Festival. It was nominated for Best Film at the 33rd Japan Academy Prize.

Cast
 Tsurube Shofukutei as Dr. Osamu Ino
 Eita as Keisuke Soma
 Kimiko Yo as Akemi Otake
 Haruka Igawa as Ritsuko Torikai
 Teruyuki Kagawa as Masayoshi Saimon
 Yutaka Matsushige as Yukinari Hatano
 Ryo Iwamatsu as Yoshifumi Okayasu
 Takashi Sasano as Tokio Sone
 Kaoru Yachigusa as Kazuko Torikai

Awards and nominations
33rd Japan Academy Prize.
 Nominated: Best Film
34th Hochi Film Award.
 Won: Best Director - Miwa Nishikawa

References

External links
  
 

2009 films
2000s Japanese-language films
Films directed by Miwa Nishikawa
Best Film Kinema Junpo Award winners
2000s Japanese films